ATS Infrastructure Limited (ATS) is an Indian real estate company, founded in 1998 by Getamber Anand. Mr. Getamber Anand is present CMD of ATS Infrastructure Limited. Its Headquarter is located in Noida, Uttar Pradesh. Investors of this companies includes financial institutions like HDFC Fund and ICICI Prudential AMC.

History
In 1998, ATS Infrastructure Ltd. originated under the flagship of Mr Getamber Anand, as an emerging new response to the growing need for quality housing and residential real estate development specifically in Delhi and the National Capital Region (NCR). HDFC Fund invested 200 crores in ATS for one of its projects in New Delhi in 2011. In 2013, the company invested 2000 crores in a project in Mohali.

References 

Real estate companies of India
Indian companies established in 1998